Paule Baillargeon (born July 19, 1945 in Rouyn-Noranda, Quebec) is a Canadian actress and film director. She won the Genie Award for Best Supporting Actress for her role in the film I've Heard the Mermaids Singing, and was a nominee for Best Director for The Sex of the Stars (Le Sexe des étoiles). Her film roles have included August 32nd on Earth (Un 32 août sur terre), Jesus of Montreal (Jésus de Montréal), A Woman in Transit (La Femme de l'hôtel), Réjeanne Padovani and Days of Darkness (L'Âge des ténèbres).

Baillargeon received a classical education at the Ursuline Convent in Quebec City and at the École Sophie-Barat in Montreal. She left the National Theatre School of Canada in 1969 without graduating and, along with Raymond Cloutier and others, founded the experimental theatre group Le Grand Cirque Ordinaire. For several years she participated in writing and performing in its collective creations, which had a marked effect on the theatre of Quebec during the late 1960s and early 1970s. Le Grand Film ordinaire: ou Jeanne D’Arc n’est pas morte, se porte bien, et vit au Québéc, released in 1971, is a documentary based on its first performance piece. Although the collective disbanded after its second film, Montréal Blues, Baillargeon’s key 1980 film co-directed with Frédérique Collin, La Cuisine rouge, adapted Le Grand Cirque’s Brechtian style to a fractured narrative about sexual stereotyping.

In 2002, she directed an NFB documentary about her friend, Claude Jutra. In 2009, Baillargeon was appointed as a filmmaker in residence by the National Film Board of Canada (NFB). In 2011, the NFB released her autobiographical work Trente tableaux, an anthology film composed of 30 filmic portraits of her 66 years of life to date, including her experiences as a woman in Quebec's changing society.

She has received Quebec's two highest film honours: the Prix Albert-Tessier in 2009 and the 2012 Jutra Award for lifetime achievement.

Filmography

As director
Anastasie, oh! ma chérie (short film, 1977)
La cuisine rouge (co-directed with Frédérique Collin, 1980)
Sonia (short film, 1986)
Solo (TV movie, 1991)
Le complexe d'Édith (short film, 1991)
Le sexe des étoiles (1993)
Une famille comme les autres (TV documentary series, 1999-2000)
Claude Jutra, portrait sur film (documentary, 2002)
Le petit Jean-Pierre, le grand Perreault (documentary short, 2004)
Un cri au bonheur (anthology film, co-directed with various, 2007) (aka Et il y avait la poésie)
Trente tableaux (feature documentary, 2011)

As actress
Réjeanne Padovani - 1973
Before the Time Comes (Le Temps de l'avant) - 1975
Confidences of the Night (L'Amour blessé) - 1975
Gina - 1975
The Vultures (Les Vautours) - 1975
East End Hustle - 1976
The Late Blossom (Le soleil se lève en retard) - 1977
Panic (Panique) - 1977
A Woman in Transit (La Femme de l'hôtel) - 1984
The Dame in Colour (La Dame en couleurs) - 1985
I've Heard the Mermaids Singing - 1987
Jesus of Montreal (Jésus de Montréal) - 1989
Lessons on Life (Trois pommes à côté du sommeil) - 1989
Four Stiffs and a Trombone (L'assassin jouait du trombone - 1991
Les Héritiers Duval - 1995-96
August 32nd on Earth (Un 32 août sur terre) - 1998
Ma voisine danse le ska - 2003
A Family Secret (Le Secret de ma mère) - 2006
Days of Darkness (L'Âge des ténèbres) - 2007
Mourning for Anna (Trois temps après la mort d'Anna) - 2010

See also
 List of female film and television directors
 List of LGBT-related films directed by women

References

External links 
 

1945 births
Actresses from Quebec
Canadian film actresses
Canadian television actresses
Best Supporting Actress Genie and Canadian Screen Award winners
People from Rouyn-Noranda
French Quebecers
Living people
Canadian women film directors
Film directors from Quebec
National Film Board of Canada people
Best Original Song Genie and Canadian Screen Award winners
Prix Albert-Tessier winners